Jordon Alexander Steele-John (born 14 October 1994) is an Australian politician and disability rights advocate. He is a member of the Australian Senate as a representative of Western Australia, and is a member of the Australian Greens party.

Steele-John was born in Northampton, England, but emigrated to Perth as a child. He began his political career in 2013, and was elected by declaration to the Senate in 2017, at age 23, making him the youngest senator in Australia's history. Steele-John is an advocate and supporter of disability rights and LGBT rights who has campaigned extensively in the disability, health and peace spaces.

Early life and career
Born in the United Kingdom, Steele-John migrated as a child to Australia with his parents. He and his brother were home-educated. Steele-John is a disability advocate who, as a student, campaigned for the Greens in both federal and state elections. He was an active member in the Brand federal electorate’s Greens group. Steele-John studied politics at Macquarie University by correspondence. However, his sudden unexpected appointment to the senate cut short his undergraduate studies. Steele-John uses a wheelchair due to cerebral palsy. Steele-John renounced British citizenship at age eighteen in preparation for the 2013 federal election, and currently only holds only Australian citizenship.

Political career
Prior to being listed as third senate candidate for the Greens in the 2016 federal election (behind Scott Ludlam and Rachel Siewert), Steele-John had been a candidate for the WA Greens three times. He was a candidate in the March 2013 state election in the electorate of Warnbro (receiving 8.8% primary vote), the September 2013 federal election in the electorate of Fremantle (receiving 11.9% primary vote) and in the April 2014 special half-senate election which followed the result of the 2013 election being voided by the Court of Disputed Returns (as the fourth candidate on the Greens' list).

Steele-John entered the Australian Senate after Western Australian senator Scott Ludlam was forced to resign when he was found to be a dual citizen and in contravention of section 44 of the Australian Constitution. On 27 October 2017, the High Court of Australia, sitting as the Court of Disputed Returns, ordered the Australian Electoral Commission to conduct a recount of senate ballots in Western Australia, and Steele-John was declared elected at age twenty-three, making him the youngest sitting member in the Australian parliament and youngest senator.

Steele-John was re-elected to the Senate at the 2019 federal election, securing 11.8% of the state's vote, with a swing of 1.48% in his favour.

As the youngest person in the Senate, Steele-John has been engaged in the youth climate movement since its inception. He is passionate about addressing the climate crisis.

Steele-John was named the McKinnon Emerging Political Leader of the Year in March 2019 for his leadership as a disability advocate. In 2021 he wrote an essay that appeared in the Growing Up Disabled in Australia anthology published by Black Inc Books.

Political positions

Disability Rights and Services 
In February 2018, Steele-John called for a Royal Commission into disabled prisoner abuse. In April 2018, Steele-John commented on Parliament House's need to become more wheelchair friendly.

In 2019, Steele-John's campaigning successfully led to the establishment of the Royal Commission into Violence, Abuse, Neglect and Exploitation of People with Disability. After years of raising the alarm that the confidentiality provisions in the Disability Royal Commission are insufficient, in 2021 he helped secure amendments that protect people making confidential disclosures to the Royal Commission.

In 2020, Steele-John successfully campaigned for a compensation scheme for thalidomide survivors, and in 2021 pressured the government to abolish independent assessments in the NDIS. He continues to campaign to increase the Disability Support Pension (DSP) and Carer Payment.

Health and Mental Health 
In 2021, Steele-John took on the Australian Greens’ Health and Mental Health portfolio and announced the Greens’ policy to expand Medicare to cover mental health treatment.

Climate Action 
Steele-John is a strong proponent for urgent climate action. In 2018, he introduced a Senate motion to condemn the lifting of the Western Australian fracking moratorium, which was unsuccessful.

Peace 
In 2020, Steele-John introduced the Defence Amendment (Parliamentary Approval of Overseas Service) Bill 2020, which seeks to ensure the decision to go to war is made by the Parliament, not the Prime Minister.

An active anti-nuclear campaigner, Steele-John is a strong advocate for Australia's signing of the Treaty on the Prohibition of Nuclear Weapons, and to rethink the AUKUS alliance.

Video games 
In February 2018, Steele-John expressed disappointment at the lack of government support for the Australian video game development industry.

Voting age 
In 2018, Steele-John introduced a bill to lower the voting age to sixteen. He argued that age would be in line with Austria, Argentina, Brazil and Scotland. The bill was not passed by parliament.

References

External links
 
 
Profile at TheyVoteForYou.org.au

1994 births
Living people
Australian Greens members of the Parliament of Australia
Members of the Australian Senate for Western Australia
Members of the Australian Senate
Australian disability rights activists
Australian politicians with disabilities
21st-century Australian politicians
People from Northampton
Australian people of British descent